Four major international peace plans were proposed before and during the Bosnian War by European Community (EC) and United Nations (UN) diplomats before the conflict was settled by the Dayton Agreement in 1995.

Background 

The Bosnian war which lasted from 1992 to 1995 was fought among its three main ethnicities Bosniaks, Croats and Serbs. Whilst the Bosniak plurality had sought a nation state across all ethnic lines, the Croats had created an autonomous community that functioned independently of central Bosnian rule, and the Serbs declared independence for the region's eastern and northern regions relevant to the Serb population. All peace plans were proposed with the view to observing Bosnia and Herzegovina as a sovereign state entire of its territorial integrity (as it had been in Yugoslavia as the SR Bosnia and Herzegovina) and without an imbalance of greater devolution and autonomy awarded to any community or region.

Carrington–Cutileiro plan 

The original Carrington–Cutileiro peace plan, named for its authors Lord Carrington and Portuguese ambassador José Cutileiro, resulted from the EC Peace Conference held in February 1992 in an attempt to prevent Bosnia-Herzegovina sliding into war. It was also referred to as the Lisbon Agreement. It proposed ethnic power-sharing on all administrative levels and the devolution of central government to local ethnic communities. However, all Bosnia-Herzegovina's districts would be classified as Bosniak, Serb or Croat under the plan, even where no ethnic majority was evident. In later negotiations, there were compromises about changing district borders. On 3 March 1992, Bosnia and Herzegovina was declared independent following a referendum held days earlier on February 29 and 1 March.

On 11 March 1992, the Assembly of the Serb People of Republika Srpska (the self-proclaimed parliament of the Bosnian Serbs) unanimously rejected the original peace plan, putting forth their own map which claimed almost two thirds of Bosnia's territory, with a series of ethnically split cities and isolated enclaves and leaving the Croats and Bosniaks with a disjointed strip of land in the centre of the republic. That plan was rejected by Cutileiro. However, he put forth a revised draft of the original which stated that the three constituent units would be "based on national principles and taking into account economic, geographic, and other criteria."

On 18 March 1992, all three sides signed the agreement; Alija Izetbegović for the Bosniaks, Radovan Karadžić for the Bosnian Serbs and Mate Boban for the Bosnian Croats.
On 28 March 1992, after a meeting with US ambassador to Yugoslavia Warren Zimmermann in Sarajevo, Izetbegović withdrew his signature and declared his opposition to any division of Bosnia.
What was said and by whom remains unclear. Warren Zimmermann denied that he told Izetbegović that if he withdrew his signature, the United States would grant recognition to Bosnia as an independent state. What is indisputable is that on the same day, Izetbegović withdrew his signature and renounced the agreement.

Vance–Owen Peace Plan

In early January 1993, the UN Special Envoy Cyrus Vance and EC representative Lord Owen began negotiating a peace proposal with the leaders of Bosnia's warring factions. The proposal, which became known as the "Vance-Owen peace plan", involved the division of Bosnia into ten semi-autonomous regions and received the backing of the UN. The President of the Republika Srpska, Radovan Karadžić, signed the plan on 30 April. However, it was rejected by the National Assembly of Republika Srpska on 6 May, and subsequently referred to a referendum. The plan was rejected by 96% of voters, although mediators referred to the referendum as a "sham". On 18 June, Lord Owen declared that the plan was "dead".

Given the pace at which territorial division, fragmentation and ethnic cleansing had occurred, the plan was already obsolete by the time it was announced. It became the last proposal that sought to salvage a mixed, united Bosnia-Herzegovina; subsequent proposals either re-enforced or contained elements of partition of Bosnia and Herzegovina.

On 1 April, Cyrus Vance announced his resignation as Special Envoy to the UN Secretary-General. He was replaced by Norwegian Foreign Minister Thorvald Stoltenberg on 1 May.

The Vance–Owen plan was a roughly sketched map, it did not establish the definitive outline of the 10 cantons and depended on final negotiations between the three ethnic groups taking place.

Owen–Stoltenberg plan 

In late July, representatives of Bosnia-Herzegovina's three warring factions entered into a new round of negotiations. On 20 August, the U.N. mediators Thorvald Stoltenberg and David Owen unveiled a map that would partition Bosnia into a union of three ethnic republics, in which Bosnian Serb forces would be given 53 percent of Bosnia-Herzegovina's territory, Muslims would be allotted 30 percent and Bosnian-Herzegovina Croats would receive 17 percent. On 28 August, in accordance with the Owen–Stoltenberg peace proposal, the Croatian Republic of Herzeg-Bosnia was proclaimed in Grude as a "republic of the Croats in Bosnia and Herzegovina". On 29 August 1993 the Bosniak side rejected the plan.

Contact Group plan 

Between February and October 1994, the Contact Group (U.S., Russia, France, Britain, and Germany) made steady progress towards a negotiated settlement of the conflict in Bosnia-Herzegovina. This was known as a Contact Group plan, and a heavy pressure was put on Bosnian Serbs to accept the plan when Federal Republic of Yugoslavia imposed an embargo on Drina river. It was also rejected in a referendum held on 28 August 1994.

During this period, the warring between Croats and Bosniaks came to an end as in March 1994, the two factions settled their differences in the Washington agreement signed in Washington, D.C. and Vienna.

Other plans by Bosnian actors 
There were also Bosniak, Croat and Serb proposals for the reorganisation of Bosnia. 
As ethnic tensions grew, one of the first Muslim proposals was announced on 25 June 1991. It called for the establishment of three entities (Muslim, Serb and Croat), each composed of two or three non-contiguous territories.
Another joint proposal by the Bosniak Party of Democratic Action (SDA) and the Croatian Democratic Union of Bosnia and Herzegovina (HDZ BiH) political parties was announced in August 1992. It called for establishing 12 cantons of Bosnia and Herzegovina, with autonomous rights.

See also
Partition of Bosnia and Herzegovina
Inter-Entity Boundary Line
Dayton Peace Accords
Croat entity in Bosnia and Herzegovina

References

Sources
Atiyas, N.B., 1995. Mediating regional conflicts and negotiating flexibility: Peace efforts in Bosnia-Herzegovina. The Annals of the American Academy of Political and Social Science, 542(1), pp. 185–201.
Goodby, J.E., 1996. When war won out: Bosnian peace plans before Dayton. International Negotiation, 1(3), pp. 501–523.
Klemenčić, M., 1994. Territorial proposals for the settlement of the war in Bosnia-Hercegovina. IBRU.
Leigh-Phippard, H., 1998. The Contact Group on (and in) Bosnia: an exercise in conflict mediation?. International Journal, 53(2), pp. 306–324.

External links

Bosnian peace process
Bosnian War
Peace treaties
Political history of Bosnia and Herzegovina
Partition (politics)